Frank Eugene Corder (May 26, 1956 – September 12, 1994) was an American truck driver. He stole a Cessna 150 late on September 11, 1994, and crashed the stolen aircraft onto the South Lawn of the White House early on September 12, 1994, while attempting to land the plane; he was killed, and was the sole casualty.

Background
Corder was born in Perry Point, Maryland, the son of William Eugene Corder, who was an aircraft mechanic at Edgewood Arsenal, and Dorothy Corder. He dropped out of Aberdeen High School in the eleventh grade and enlisted in the Army in October 1974. Corder was stationed at Fort Knox, Kentucky and Fort Carson, Colorado, where he was trained as a mechanic. He was honorably discharged from military service in July 1975 at the rank of private first class. After his service ended, he worked as a truck driver from 1976 until his employment was terminated in early 1993.

On April 15, 1993, Corder was arrested for theft and was arrested again later that year on October 9 for drug dealing. He was sentenced to spend 90 days at a drug rehabilitation center and was released in February 1994. After he was released, he was living with his third wife Lydia at Keyser's Motel in Aberdeen, Maryland. Lydia Corder left Frank three weeks prior to the incident, which is thought to have driven him towards deep depression and suicide. Friends claim he bore no ill will towards President Bill Clinton and probably only wanted the publicity of the stunt, based largely on his sentiments towards Mathias Rust's flight of a Cessna 172 from Finland to Moscow, USSR. The President was not even in the mansion at the time due to renovations, but was instead staying at Blair House.

Incident

Corder stole the Cessna on the night of September 11 and departed from Harford County Airport in Churchville, Maryland while severely intoxicated, which is presumed to have led to his later miscalculation. The plane was noticed by radar technicians at Ronald Reagan National Airport several minutes before he tried to steer it into the wall of the White House. At 1:49 a.m., he hit the South Lawn and died on impact.

The crash caused a re-evaluation in security procedures around the White House, as the pilot had entered restricted airspace. Though the White House is rumored to be equipped with surface-to-air missiles, none were fired.  The Secret Service has neither confirmed nor dispelled the rumor.

See also
Samuel Byck
Francisco Martin Duran
List of White House security breaches
White House intruders
United Airlines Flight 93 - Hijackers tried to take over the flight during the September 11 attacks, with a destination of either the White House or the US Capitol. However the passengers and crew tried to take back control and during the ensuing struggle the plane crashed near Shanksville, Pennsylvania

References

Further reading
Summary statement of facts on the September 12, 1994 plane crash
Public report of the White House Security Review 
 Pear, Robert. "Friends Depict Loner with Unraveling Life." New York Times, September 13, 1994.

1956 births
1994 suicides
1994 crimes in the United States
Attacks in the United States in 1994
White House intruders
Failed assassins of presidents of the United States
United States Army soldiers
Aviation accidents and incidents in the United States in 1994
Aviators killed in aviation accidents or incidents in the United States
September 1994 events in the United States
Suicides in Washington, D.C.
American failed assassins
1994 in the United States
1994 in Washington, D.C.
People from Cecil County, Maryland
Military personnel from Maryland
20th-century American politicians
Burials at Arlington National Cemetery
Victims of aviation accidents or incidents in 1994